Pokrom is a village in the Akuapim South Municipal district, a district in the Eastern Region of Ghana.

References

Villages in Ghana
Populated places in the Eastern Region (Ghana)